Optand is a locality situated in Östersund Municipality, Jämtland County, Sweden with 257 inhabitants in 2010.

References 

Populated places in Östersund Municipality
Jämtland